Move Forward is the debut album by British electronic rock band KLOQ, released 26 June 2008. The album was released via Out of Line Music.

The album reached No. 1 on the Deutsche Alternative Charts, spending 7 weeks there and was No. 7 also on that chart's album of the year chart. Due to the success of the album, the album also finished the year at No. 2 on the International Album Charts only behind Nine Inch Nails.

Track listing

Personnel
Oz Morsley – synths, programming
Douglas McCarthy - guest vocals ("You Never Know" and "We're Just Physical")
Greg Cumbers - guest vocals ("I Never Said", "Move Forward" and "Connecting")
Lucia Holm - guest vocals ("Kloq Film 1")
Paolo Morena - guest vocals ("My Safe Place")

References

2008 debut albums
KLOQ (band) albums